Ice Twisters is a Canadian-American made-for-television science fiction-disaster film that was directed by Steven R. Monroe and aired on Syfy on November 14, 2009.

Plot
A research team, including Joanne (Camille Sullivan), Damon (Alex Zahara), Gary (Ryan Kennedy) and Phil (Nicholas Carella),  deploy small UAVs from a C130 Hercules, to interfere with a storm. At first the group celebrate a good result; however, a large storm begins to develop.

Meanwhile, Charlie (Mark Moses), an ex-scientist, is in town to promote his new book, with his assistant Nora (Chelan Simmons) in the (fictional) town of Harrisford, Oregon. As Charlie does a book signing at a local book shop, the storm hits the town. Charlie and Nora narrowly escape death; however, the storm kills many others.

Just outside town, a young couple Eric (Kaj-Erik Eriksen) and Ashley (Luisa D'Oliveira) are traveling to meet with Charlie as part of their university course. Eric notices a strange weather pattern, but Ashley takes no notice, as she is in a rush to get to the book signing. In town, Nora is taken to hospital for injuries while Charlie meets up with his old friend Joanne (Camille Sullivan) and also Damon (Alex Zahara), who have rushed to the scene after their computers detected the storm.

Joanne wishes to stop the program and so orders Damon to phone their backer Frank (Robert Moloney). However, Frank tells Damon he will not stop the experiment until it has been completed and so allows the small UAVs to continue flying. Meanwhile, another storm freezes a farmer. Charlie, Joanne and Damon rush to the scene where they discover one of the UAVs that has crashed. Joanne tells Charlie about the experiment. Nora then phones Charlie. She is leaving town for the TV show Charlie has an appearance on later that day. Meanwhile, Eric and Ashley arrive at the book signing to discover it has finished and begin to leave town.

Charlie, Joanne and Damon travel back to their experiment site, where they meet up with Gary and Phil. Charlie comes up with a theory of how the UAVs are causing the storms, and Damon tells Joanne Frank has not aborted the experiment. Angrily, Joanne phones Frank to warn him, but Frank rejects her calls. As Eric and Ashley leave town, a tornado forms. Nora's car is hit by a train locomotive sucked up by the storm. After the tornado disappears, Eric and Ashley walk back to town. At the experiment site, another tornado hits. The group flee but Phil is killed. They go to a nearby hotel where they discover Frank has blocked them from deactivating the UAVs. Eric and Ashley break into a building where they decide to change their presentation to the freak weather after Eric caught it on camera.

The group come across wreckage where they discover Nora's body. A furious Joanne blames Damon for not making Frank finish the experiment. As Charlie mourns Nora's death, another storm hits, forcing the group to flee. After a plane that Frank sent into the sky crashes, he wishes to deactivate the UAVs; however, Bill (Dion Johnstone) informs him they are not responding. The group travel to the same building Eric and Ashley are at, and Gary begins to try and deactivate the UAVs. They realize the storms will reach populated areas very soon and warn Frank, who allows the UAVs to be destroyed. However, the storm continues to grow despite the UAVs having been destroyed. While Eric and Ashley send out signals to warn people, Charlie, Joanne and Damon rush to the university to use its satellite to punch a hole in the ozone layer to extinguish the storms, while the ice twister strikes Portland. While arriving, Damon is killed by large hailstones. Meanwhile, Gary manages to connect to a satellite in space. The plan works and the storms are extinguished.

Eric and Ashley help Charlie and Joanne put Frank in prison for manipulating the team into creating a weapon.

Cast
 Mark Moses as Charlie Price
 Camille Sullivan as Joanne Dyson
 Alex Zahara as Damon Jarwell 
 Ryan Kennedy as Gary
 Kaj-Erik Eriksen as Eric
 Luisa d'Oliveira as Ashley
 Chelan Simmons as Nora Elman
 Robert Moloney as Frank O'Neil 
 Dion Johnstone as Bill
 Nicholas Carella as Phil
 Ingrid Mila Torrance as Dra. Austin
 Jeremy Radick as Book Geek
 Garvin Cross as Farmer Oullette
 Rob Hayter as Guard

Home media release
The film was released on DVD by First Look Home Entertainment on April 13, 2010.

References

External links
 
 
 

Syfy original films
2009 television films
2009 films
2000s disaster films
2009 science fiction films
English-language Canadian films
Canadian disaster films
American science fiction television films
American disaster films
Canadian science fiction television films
CineTel Films films
Disaster television films
Films about tornadoes
Films set in the 21st century
Films set in Oregon
Films directed by Steven R. Monroe
2000s American films
2000s Canadian films